Seneca Casino may refer to:

Seneca Allegany Casino, in Salamanca, New York
Seneca Niagara Casino & Hotel, in Niagara Falls, New York